54th edition of the tournament will feature 15 teams including Burgan SC for the first time.

Qadsia SC enter as defending champions as last season winners.

Preliminary round

Round 1
Preliminary round winner:
Burgan SC

Round 2
Round 1 winners:
 Al-Sahel SC
 Al-Fahaheel FC

Round 3
Round 2 winners:
 Al-Yarmouk SC
 Al-Nasr SC

Quarter-finals
Round 3 winners:
Khaitan SC
Al-Yarmouk SC
Seeded teams:
Al-Arabi SC
Qadsia SC
Kuwait SC
Al-Salmiya SC
Al-Jahra SC
Kazma SC

Semi-finals
Quarter-finals winners:
Kuwait SC
Al-Arabi SC
Al-Salmiya SC
Qadsia SC

Final

See also
2015-16 in Kuwaiti football

References

External links

Kuwait Emir Cup seasons
Kuwait Emir Cup
Emir Cup